Théophile Sowié (died 7 April 2021) was a Burkinabe actor.

Biography
Sowié attended the Institute of Theatre Studies at the University of Sorbonne Nouvelle Paris 3 and the École d'art dramatique Jacques Lecoq in Paris. In the film Lumumba directed by Raoul Peck, he played Minister of Youth and Sports of the Republic of the Congo Maurice Mpolo. He was well known in France for his role as the postman in Les Visiteurs. He was therefore able to appear in the sequel, titled The Visitors II: The Corridors of Time.

Théophile Sowié died on 7 April 2021. He was buried in his home village of Bérégadougou.

Filmography

Feature films
 (1991)
Les Visiteurs (1993)
The Visitors II: The Corridors of Time (1998)
Louise (Take 2) (1998)
Les Migrations de Vladimir (1999)
Lumumba (2000)
 (2001)
Magonia (2001)
Moolaadé (2004)
 (2012)
Le Crocodile du Botswanga (2014)
 (2014)

Telefilms
Petit (1993)
 (2015)

Television
Navarro (1990)
Antoine Rives, juge du terrorisme (1993)
Navarro (1993)
 (2010)

Awards
Prix Radio-France

References

2021 deaths
Year of birth missing
Burkinabé male actors
Sorbonne Nouvelle University Paris 3 alumni
People from Cascades Region
21st-century Burkinabé people